Lichtenhain may refer to:

 Lichtenhain (Sebnitz), a village in the town of Sebnitz, Saxony
 Lichtenhain/Bergbahn, a former municipality in the district Saalfeld-Rudolstadt, now part of Oberweißbach, Thuringia

See also
 Lichtenhain Waterfall, a water fall near Lichtenhain (Sebnitz)